Federalist No. 23 is an essay by Alexander Hamilton, the twenty-third of The Federalist Papers. It was published on December 18, 1787 under the pseudonym Publius, the name under which all The Federalist papers were published. One of the more significant essays in the series, No. 23 attempts to justify the increased strength of the federal government under the proposed United States Constitution, compared to the then-active Articles of Confederation. The paper is entitled "The Necessity of a Government as Energetic as the One Proposed to the Preservation of the Union".

Critics of the Constitution, particularly the Anti-Federalists who opposed the expansion of federal power, brought many counterarguments against Hamilton's position. Though they failed to carry the day, as the Constitution was indeed ratified, their concern about the federal government being too powerful motivated the Bill of Rights, particularly the Tenth Amendment to the United States Constitution.

The question
In the first 22 Federalist papers, Publius argued for the importance of the Union and that the Articles of Confederation were insufficient to preserve the Union. Federalist No. 23 begins a series of fourteen papers arguing in support of the basic thesis that an energetic federal government is necessary. Too-powerful governments were a major worry in America, which had declared independence from Britain partly because of a belief that the government in London inappropriately had dominated the local governments in the colonies. Hamilton tried to allay popular fears that the new federal government would be no less abusive than the British government had been.

Publius' argument
Hamilton identifies the principal purposes of the Union: "The common defence of the members—the preservation of the public peace as well against internal convulsions as external attacks—the regulation of commerce with other nations and between the States—the superintendence of our intercourse, political and commercial, with foreign countries."

For the common defense, Hamilton focuses on the ability to raise and direct armies and fleets. He invokes a central principle of proportionality of means to ends: "the means ought to be proportional to the end; the persons from whose agency the attainment of any end is expected ought to possess the means by which it is attained." Accordingly, he argues that if the federal government is tasked with the common defense, it must have complete power to raise and direct military forces. By contrast, under the Articles of Confederation the federal government had to requisition supplies and troops from the states. The new Constitution resolved this issue by allowing the Union to levy troops and build fleets. To give the federal government less than complete power, Hamilton argued, would be "improvidently to trust the great interests of the nation to hands which are disabled from managing them with vigor and success."

Also, a common defense is vital to the preservation of the Union because "it is impossible to foresee or define the extent and variety of national exigencies." Any unforeseeable attack from foreign powers is imminent.

Anti-Federalist counterarguments
Thomas Jefferson,

References

Hamilton, Alexander; Madison, James; and Jay, John. The Federalist. Edited by Jacob E. Cooke. Middletown, Conn.: Wesleyan University Press, 1961.
Storing, Herbert J., ed. The Complete Anti-Federalist. Chicago: University of Chicago Press, 1981.

External links 

 Text of The Federalist No. 23: congress.gov

23
1787 in American law
1787 essays
1787 in the United States